How Soccer Explains the World: An Unlikely Theory of Globalization (also published as How Football Explains the World: An Unlikely Theory of Globalization) is a book written by American journalist Franklin Foer.  It is an analysis of the interchange between soccer and the new global economy.

The author takes readers on a journey from stadium to stadium around the globe in an attempt to shed new insights on today's world events, both from political and economic standpoints. Soccer is here the globalized medium that seems to lend itself to explaining the effects globalization has on society as a whole.

Themes

Failure of globalization 

In the first couple of chapters, Franklin Foer addresses "the failure of globalization to erode ancient hatreds in the game’s great rivalries," which is associated with football hooligans. The book continues on and talks about sectarian conflicts between supporters of Celtic F.C. and Rangers F.C. (the Old Firm) in Scotland and the tendency of supporters of Tottenham Hotspur F.C. and AFC Ajax to appropriate Jewish symbols and terminology, which results in conflicting views  between things such as the antisemitic chants and taunts.

Rise of corporate hegemons 

In the second part of the text, the author uses soccer "to address economics: the consequences of migration, the persistence of corruption, and the rise of powerful new oligarchs like Silvio Berlusconi, the President of [both] Italy and the AC Milan club".

Persistence of nationalism and tribalism 

In the final part, Foer uses soccer "to defend the virtues of old-fashioned nationalism", as "a way to blunt the return of tribalism".

Reception 

The book received positive reviews in The New York Times and The Washington Post.  Critics for The San Francisco Chronicle and The Boston Globe praised Foer's portrait of the soccer world while dismissing his larger arguments.

See also 

 The Last Save of Moacyr Barbosa
 Among the Thugs
 Globalization

References

External links 
 How Soccer Explains the World interview with Foer about the book in Mother Jones
 How Soccer Explains the World on Metacritic

2004 non-fiction books
Association football books
Books about globalization
HarperCollins books